The German Gold Cup  was a darts tournament that has been held annually since 1985.

List of winners

References

External links
http://www.dartsdatabase.co.uk/TournamentDetails.German Gold Cup
German Darts Federation

1985 establishments in Germany
2015 disestablishments in Germany
Darts tournaments
Recurring sporting events established in 1985
Recurring sporting events disestablished in 2015
Sport in Bremen (city)